Since Malta's Independence in 1964, there has been a rapid increase in buildings all over the country. However, most of the urban areas are concentrated around the Grand Harbour and Marsamxett Harbour areas where some of the country's most busy places are situated; Sliema, Saint Julian's, Paceville, Msida, Gżira, Ta' Xbiex and Pietà.

As cars and road transport grew more and more popular in the country, the population started to spread out to farther areas and nowadays some other urban areas have developed; Saint Paul's Bay (including Qawra, Buġibba and Xemxija) and Mellieħa in the North, whilst having Marsaskala and the Malta Freeport area in the South of the country.

Some of the tall buildings in Malta, such as the Metropolis Plaza in Gżira, are still under construction.

Tallest buildings in Malta 
The list includes highrise buildings (above ) in Malta.

Churches 
The list includes churches (above ) in Malta.

Buildings planned or under construction

Further reading
Malta’s giddy high-rise future
List of the tallest buildings in Europe
List of the tallest buildings in the European Union
List of the tallest buildings in Cyprus

References

External links 

 Portomaso Business Tower

Malta

Malta
Tallest